Byron Kay Foulger (August 27, 1898 – April 4, 1970) was an American character actor who over a 50-year career performed in hundreds of stage, film, and television productions.

Early years
Born in Ogden, Utah, Byron was the second of four children of Annie Elizabeth (née Ingebertsen) of Norway and Arthur Kay Foulger, a native of Utah who worked as a carpenter for the region's railroad company. Byron completed his primary and secondary education in local public schools before enrolling at the University of Utah, where he started acting through his participation in community theatre. Foulger was a member of the Church of Jesus Christ of Latter-day Saints.

Career 
Foulger made his Broadway debut in March 1920 in a production of Medea featuring Moroni Olsen, and performed in four more productions with Olsen on the "Great White Way", back-to-back, ending in April 1922. He then toured with Olsen's stock company.

By the early 1930s, Foulger was working at the Pasadena Playhouse as an actor, assistant director, and director. In 1932 he began performing in films, initially in bit parts. His first three screen appearances are in Night World (1932), The Little Minister (1934), and The President's Mystery (1936), the latter based on a story by Franklin Delano Roosevelt. He also starred in an exploitation film, It's All in Your Mind (1937, released 1938), in which Foulger, a timid bookkeeper, samples the fast life of nightclubs and parties. Byron Foulger's motion picture career, however, did not begin in earnest until 1937, after he performed in December of that year on NBC Radio opposite Mae West in a racy "Adam and Eve" sketch on the network's popular variety program The Chase and Sanborn Hour. That sketch and another performance by West with Charlie McCarthy during a later segment of the same program resulted in her being banned from NBC programming until 1950. Foulger, who provided the voice of the serpent in the controversial biblical parody, was not banned for his brief supporting role; instead, his association with the sketch brought him widespread media attention and greater audience recognition. From that point on, he worked steadily in motion pictures.

Foulger played many partsstorekeepers, hotel desk clerks, morticians, professors, bank tellers, ministers, confidence men, and a host of other characterizationsusually timid, whining, weak-willed, shifty, sanctimonious, or sycophantic. His earliest films show him clean-shaven, but in the 1940s, he adopted a wispy mustache that emphasized his characters' worried demeanor. When the mustache went gray in the 1950s, he reverted to a clean-shaven look. Foulger was a resourceful actor, and often embellished his scripted lines with memorable bits of business; in The Falcon Strikes Back, for example, hotel clerk Foulger announces a homicide by bellowing across the lobby: "Mur-der! Mur-der!'''

In real life, Foulger was not as much of a pushover as the characters he played. In one memorable incident at a party, he threatened to punch Errol Flynn for flirting with his wife, actress Dorothy Adams, to whom he was married from 1921 until his death in 1970.

In the 1940s, Foulger was part of Preston Sturges' unofficial "stock company" of character actors, appearing in five films written by Sturges, The Great McGinty, Sullivan's Travels, The Palm Beach Story, The Miracle of Morgan's Creek (recreating the role of McGinty's secretary he played in The Great McGinty), and The Great Moment. In A pictures, such as those of Sturges', Foulger often received no screen credit; in B movies such as 1939's The Man They Could Not Hang, he got more substantial, billed parts.

By the late 1950s, Foulger was so well established as a mild-mannered worrywart that just the showing of his face would receive a welcoming audience laugh (as in the cameo-laden Frank Capra comedy Pocketful of Miracles). In a humorous coup, the actor was cast against type for the most prominent role of his career; he played the Devil opposite The Bowery Boys in Up in Smoke, and was billed in advertisements and posters as one of the film's three stars.

Beginning in 1950, Foulger made more than 90 appearances on television, in such programs as Death Valley Days, I Love Lucy, The Cisco Kid, My Little Margie, The Man Behind the Badge, The Lone Ranger, Maverick, Lawman, The Red Skelton Show, Rawhide, Wagon Train, Bonanza, Burke's Law, Daniel Boone, Hazel, The Patty Duke Show, The Monkees, Perry Mason, Laredo, Gunsmoke, and in 1965, The Beverly Hillbillies and The Addams Family. He played multiple-episode characters on Dennis the Menace (Mr. Timberlake), Lassie (Dan Porter) and The Andy Griffith Show (Fred, the hotel clerk). On Petticoat Junction he played two recurring roles: Mr. Guerney and engineer Wendell Gibbs.

His notable later television credits include the 1959 Twilight Zone episode "Walking Distance" in which actor Gig Young tells Foulger, who is portraying a drugstore counterman, that he thinks he has seen him before, to which Foulger replies, "I've got that kind of face." A few examples of his other credits on television are his performances in the short-lived comedies My Mother the Car (as one of the villain's browbeaten advisors) and Captain Nice (as the hero's often silent father), as well as in two episodes of the crime drama The Mod Squad in 1968 and 1969.

Foulger's last performances were released in 1970, the year he died. They include the made-for-TV movie The Love War and in the feature films There Was a Crooked Man... and The Cockeyed Cowboys of Calico County.

Death
Foulger, at age 71, died of heart problems in Hollywood on April 4, 1970. His memorial niche is located in the Del Prado Mausoleum at Inglewood Park Cemetery in Inglewood, California.

FilmographyNight World (1932) - Mr. Baby / Nightclub Patron (uncredited) (film debut)The Little Minister (1934) - Villager at Stabbing (uncredited)The President's Mystery (1936) - Minor Role (uncredited)Larceny on the Air (1937) - Pete AndorkaThe Devil Diamond (1937) - Ole-HouseboyDick Tracy (1937, Serial) as Korvitch [Chs. 1, 12]History Is Made at Night (1937) - Vail Employee Reading from Newspaper (uncredited)Make Way for Tomorrow (1937) - Mr. Dale (uncredited)A Day at the Races (1937) - Racetrack Spectator (uncredited)The Devil Is Driving (1937) - Mr. Muller (uncredited)The Prisoner of Zenda (1937) - Johann (uncredited)It Happened in Hollywood (1937) - Chet (uncredited)
 Luck of Roaring Camp (1937) - KentuckThe Duke Comes Back (1937) - PetersTrue Confession (1937) - Ballistic Expert (uncredited)Born to Be Wild (1938) - HusbandKing of the Newsboys (1938) - Gazette Owner (uncredited)It's All in Your Mind (1938) - Wilbur CraneTest Pilot (1938) - Designer (uncredited)The Lady in the Morgue (1938) - Al Horn (uncredited)Crime Ring (1938) - George Myles (uncredited)Delinquent Parents (1938) - Herbert EllisSmashing the Rackets (1938) - Alverson - Chemist (uncredited)Tenth Avenue Kid (1938) - Dr. BelknapI Am the Law (1938) - Simpson (uncredited)You Can't Take It with You (1938) - Kirby's Assistant (uncredited)The Mad Miss Manton (1938) - Assistant News Editor (uncredited)The Spider's Web (1938, Serial) - Allen RobertsA Man to Remember (1938) - Bank Teller (uncredited)Tarnished Angel (1938) - Second CrippleGangster's Boy (1938) - District Attorney's Secretary (uncredited)Say It in French (1938) - Swedish Janitor (uncredited)I Am a Criminal (1938) - Ed HarperSmashing the Spy Ring (1938) - Schuster aka Quirk (uncredited)Mystery of the White Room (1939) - The Coroner (uncredited)Let Us Live (1939) - Defense Attorney (uncredited)Streets of New York (1939) - 'Murderer' in Classroom (uncredited)Union Pacific (1939) - Andrew Whipple (uncredited)Some Like It Hot (1939) - Radio Announcer (uncredited)Missing Daughters (1939) - Bert Ford (uncredited)Exile Express (1939) - SergeThe Girl from Mexico (1939) - Delivery Entrance Guard (uncredited)Million Dollar Legs (1939) - Frederick Day, Dean Wixby's Secretary (uncredited)Andy Hardy Gets Spring Fever (1939) - Mark Hansen (uncredited)The Spellbinder (1939) - J.J. Henkins - Auditor (uncredited)Mutiny on the Blackhawk (1939) - Coombs - a SailorIn Name Only (1939) - Owen - Clerk (uncredited)Girl from Rio (1939) - William WilsonThe Man They Could Not Hang (1939) - LangHawaiian Nights (1939) - Evans (uncredited)A Woman Is the Judge (1939) - Ballistic Expert (uncredited)Sabotage (1939) - Henry - Husband of Laura Austin (uncredited)Mr. Smith Goes to Washington (1939) - Hopper's Secretary (uncredited)Television Spy (1939) - William Sheldon
 Beware Spooks! (1939) - Bank Cashier (uncredited)Bad Little Angel (1939) - New Sentinel Editor (uncredited)The Secret of Dr. Kildare (1939) - Hospital Attendant (uncredited)Heroes of the Saddle (1940) - Superintendent MelloneyAbe Lincoln in Illinois (1940) - Politician (uncredited)The Saint's Double Trouble (1940) - Ephraim Byrd (uncredited)Parole Fixer (1940) - Florist (uncredited)Flash Gordon Conquers the Universe (1940, Serial) - Professor Drok [Chs. 11-12]Curtain Call (1940) - Theater Group Director (uncredited)The Man with Nine Lives (1940) - Dr. BassettEdison, the Man (1940) - Edwin HallOpened by Mistake (1940) - Roger Weatherby (uncredited)Untamed (1940) - Nels (uncredited)Three Faces West (1940) - Joe Stebbins (uncredited)The Great McGinty (1940) - Governor's Secretary (uncredited)Golden Gloves (1940) - Hemingway (uncredited)Boom Town (1940) - Geologist (uncredited)I Want a Divorce (1940) - Secretary (uncredited)Good Bad Boys (1940, Short) - Mr. Stephens - Store Proprietor (uncredited)Sky Murder (1940) - KuseArizona (1940) - Pete KitchenEllery Queen, Master Detective (1940) - AmosDr. Kildare's Crisis (1940) - Orderly at Emergency Switchboard (uncredited)Behind the News (1940) - John - Alcoholic Father (uncredited)Ridin' on a Rainbow (1941) - Matt 'Pop' EvansBlonde Inspiration (1941) - Hutchins' Associate (uncredited)Meet Boston Blackie (1941) - Blind Man (uncredited)The Penalty (1941) - Bank Manager (uncredited)Man Made Monster (1941) - Alienist #2Sis Hopkins (1941) - JoeRoar of the Press (1941) - Eddie Tate (uncredited)Under Age (1941) - DowneyThe Gay Vagabond (1941) - VogelShe Knew All the Answers (1941) - Man in the Elevator (uncredited)Sweetheart of the Campus (1941) - Dr. BaileyI Was a Prisoner on Devil's Island (1941) - Presidente Judge (uncredited)The Deadly Game (1941) - Motel ManagerMystery Ship (1941) - WassermanHelping Hands (1941, Short) - Head of the civilian counselThe Stork Pays Off (1941) - Teacher (uncredited)You Belong to Me (1941) - Delaney (uncredited)Come Back, Miss Pipps (1941, Short) - Attorney Arthur Prince (uncredited)Ellery Queen and the Murder Ring (1941) - Male Nurse (uncredited)The Night of January 16th (1941) - Jeweler (uncredited)H.M. Pulham, Esq. (1941) - Curtis Cole (uncredited)Sullivan's Travels (1941) - Mr. Johnny ValdelleDude Cowboy (1941) - Frank AdamsHarvard, Here I Come! (1941) - Prof. AlvinRoad to Happiness (1941) - JacksonBedtime Story (1941) - First Hotel Clerk (uncredited)Remember the Day (1941) - Mr. Blanton - Photographer (uncredited)Man from Headquarters (1942) - Hotel Manager ClarkThe Power of God (1942) - Dr. BraddenThe Adventures of Martin Eden (1942) - Smithers (uncredited)Reap the Wild Wind (1942) - Bixby (uncredited)Who Is Hope Schuyler? (1942) - GeorgeFingers at the Window (1942) - Bird Man (uncredited)The Tuttles of Tahiti (1942) - Assistant Bank Manager (uncredited)A Desperate Chance for Ellery Queen (1942) - Freddy Froelich (uncredited)The Panther's Claw (1942) - Everett P. DigberryPacific Rendezvous (1942) - Decoding Room Clerk (uncredited)Flying with Music (1942) - Horace Willpott, Travel Guide (uncredited)Miss Annie Rooney (1942) - Mr. Randall (uncredited)The Magnificent Dope (1942) - Fifth Man to Leave Class (uncredited)Sabotage Squad (1942) - Suspect (uncredited)The Palm Beach Story (1942) - Jewelry Salesman (uncredited)The Man in the Trunk (1942) - Man at Auction (uncredited)Apache Trail (1942) - Clerk (uncredited)The Forest Rangers (1942) - Collector (uncredited)Wrecking Crew (1942) - Mission WorkerQuiet Please, Murder (1942) - Edmund Walpole (uncredited)Stand by for Action (1942) - Pharmacist's Mate 'Doc' MillerMargin for Error (1943) - Drug Store Clerk (uncredited)The Human Comedy (1943) - Mr. Blenton - Track Coach (uncredited)Hoppy Serves a Writ (1943) - Danvers - Hardware Store ProprietorDixie Dugan (1943) - SecretaryHangmen Also Die! (1943) - BartosThe Falcon Strikes Back (1943) - Mr. Argyle - Hotel Clerk (uncredited)Shantytown (1943) - Politician (uncredited)Dr. Gillespie's Criminal Case (1943) - Father (uncredited)The Black Raven (1943) - Horace WeatherbyConey Island (1943) - Organist at Wedding (uncredited)Henry Aldrich Swings It (1943) - Drugstore Owner (uncredited)Appointment in Berlin (1943) - Herr Van Leyden (uncredited)First Comes Courage (1943) - Norwegian Shopkeeper (uncredited)Hi Diddle Diddle (1943) - WatsonSilver Spurs (1943) - Justice of the PeaceThe Adventures of a Rookie (1943) - Mr. Linden (uncredited)So Proudly We Hail! (1943) - Mr. Larson (uncredited)The Kansan (1943) - Ed Tracy (uncredited)Sweet Rosie O'Grady (1943) - Rimplemayer (uncredited)In Old Oklahoma (1943) - WilkinsThe Miracle of Morgan's Creek (1943) - McGinty's Secretary (uncredited)What a Woman! (1943) - Buxton Hotel Clerk (uncredited)Beautiful But Broke (1944) - Maxwell McKayLady in the Death House (1944) - Mr. Avery (uncredited)The Whistler (1944) - Flophouse Desk Clerk (uncredited)Gambler's Choice (1944) - Phony Robbery Victim (uncredited)Once Upon a Time (1944) - Theatregoer (uncredited)Ministry of Fear (1944) - Mr. Newby (uncredited)Stars on Parade (1944) - Mr. Barker (uncredited)Ladies of Washington (1944) - Desk Clerk (uncredited)3 Men in White (1944) - Technician (uncredited)A Night of Adventure (1944) - Battersby, Glove Expert (uncredited)Roger Touhy, Gangster (1944) - Court Clerk (uncredited)Take It Big (1944) - Mr. Jones (uncredited)Henry Aldrich's Little Secret (1944) - Bill CollectorSince You Went Away (1944) - High School Principal (uncredited)Summer Storm (1944) - Clerk in Newspaper Office (uncredited)The Great Moment (1944) - Morton's Clinic Manager (uncredited)Swing in the Saddle (1944) - Sheriff Mort TuckerMaisie Goes to Reno (1944) - Dr. Joe Carter - Psychiatrist (uncredited)When Strangers Marry (1944) - Albert Foster (uncredited)Casanova Brown (1944) - Fletcher (uncredited)Marriage Is a Private Affair (1944) - Ned BoltonEver Since Venus (1944) - Henley, the Druggist (uncredited)Barbary Coast Gent (1944) - Assayer H.E. Holcomb (uncredited)Dark Mountain (1944) - Harvey BatesMusic in Manhattan (1944) - Ticket Agent (uncredited)An American Romance (1944) - High School Principal (uncredited)Mrs. Parkington (1944) - Norman Vance (uncredited)Girl Rush (1944) - Oscar - Hotel Proprietor (uncredited)Mystery of the River Boat (1944, Serial) - Dr. H. HartmanEnemy of Women (1944) - Krause, Brown ShirtAnd Now Tomorrow (1944) - Clerk (uncredited)Music for Millions (1944) - Mr. Perkins (uncredited)Let's Go Steady (1945) - Waldemar Oates (uncredited)Grissly's Millions (1945) - Fred PalmorAdventures of Kitty O'Day (1945) - RobertsBrewster's Millions (1945) - Attorney Lyons (uncredited)Circumstantial Evidence (1945) - BolgerIt's in the Bag! (1945) - Mr. Teckler (uncredited)The Master Key (1945, Serial) - Prof. Elwood HendersonDon Juan Quilligan (1945) - Dr. Spenser, DDS (uncredited)Wonder Man (1945) - Deli Customer (uncredited)Blonde from Brooklyn (1945) - Harvey (uncredited)The Cheaters (1945) - Process Server (uncredited)The Hidden Eye (1945) - Burton LorrisonArson Squad (1945) - Amos BaxterWeek-End at the Waldorf (1945) - Joe - Chip's Barber (uncredited)Sensation Hunters (1945) - Mark RogersVoice of the Whistler (1945) - Georgie (uncredited)Cornered (1945) - Hotel Night Clerk (uncredited)Snafu (1945) - Phil FordFollow That Woman (1945) - Orville (uncredited)Scarlet Street (1945) - Jones - Apartment Manager (uncredited)Adventure (1945) - Mr. Littleton (uncredited)People Are Funny (1946) - Mr. Button (uncredited)Deadline at Dawn (1946) - Night Attendant (uncredited)Breakfast in Hollywood (1946) - Mr. Henderson (uncredited)Sentimental Journey (1946) - Mr. Tweedy (uncredited)Just Before Dawn (1946) - Harris, Makeup Man (uncredited)House of Horrors (1946) - Mr. Samuels (uncredited)Blonde Alibi (1946) - Wilson (uncredited)The Hoodlum Saint (1946) - J. Cornwall Travers (uncredited)Two Sisters from Boston (1946) - Recording Technician (uncredited)The Postman Always Rings Twice (1946) - Picnic Manager (uncredited)The French Key (1946) - PeabodySuspense (1946) - Cab Driver at Lodge (uncredited)The Mysterious Mr. M (1946, Serial) - Wetherby / Mr. MCourage of Lassie (1946) - Dr. Coleman (uncredited)The Secret of the Whistler (1946) - Jorgensen (uncredited)Plainsman and the Lady (1946) - Mr. SimmonsDick Tracy vs. Cueball (1946) - Simon LittleMagnificent Doll (1946) - Politician (uncredited)Till the Clouds Roll By (1946) - Frohman's Secretary (uncredited)San Quentin (1946) - Mr. Dixon, Coffee Shop Proprietor (uncredited)The Show-Off (1946) - Mr. Jenkins (uncredited)It's a Joke, Son! (1947) - GrocerymanEasy Come, Easy Go (1947) - Sporting Goods Shop Owner (uncredited)The Michigan Kid (1947) - Mr. PorterBells of San Fernando (1947) - Francisco Garcia, Mission BlacksmithStallion Road (1947) - (uncredited)Hard Boiled Mahoney (1947) - Prof. QuizardLove and Learn (1947) - The Bridegroom (uncredited)The Adventures of Don Coyote (1947) - Henry FeltonFun on a Weekend (1947) - Man at Lunch Counter (uncredited)Too Many Winners (1947) - Ben Edwards/Claude BatesThe Long Night (1947) - Man with Bike (uncredited)The Trouble with Women (1947) - Little Thin Man (uncredited)They Won't Believe Me (1947) - Harry Bascomb - Mortician (uncredited)Second Chance (1947) - Emery (uncredited)Unconquered (1947) - Townsman (uncredited)Song of Love (1947) - Bailiff (uncredited)Linda, Be Good (1947) - Bookshop OwnerThe Chinese Ring (1947) - ArmstrongArch of Triumph (1948) - Policeman at Accident (uncredited)Relentless (1948) - Assayer (uncredited)The Bride Goes Wild (1948) - Max (uncredited)Borrowed Trouble (1948) - Mike the Bartender (uncredited)A Southern Yankee (1948) - Mr. Duncan (scenes deleted)They Live by Night (1948) - LambertOut of the Storm (1948) - Al WeinstockI Surrender Dear (1948) - George RogersThe Three Musketeers (1948) - Bonacieux (uncredited)The Return of October (1948) - Jonathan Grant (uncredited)The Kissing Bandit (1948) - Grandee (uncredited)He Walked by Night (1948) - Freddie - Bureau of Records and Identification (uncredited)Let's Live a Little (1948) - Mr. Hopkins (uncredited)Trouble Preferred (1948) - O'Rourke (uncredited)I Shot Jesse James (1949) - Silver King Room ClerkTucson (1949) - Elkins (uncredited)Streets of Laredo (1949) - Artist Who Draws Reming (uncredited)Arson, Inc. (1949) - Thomas PeysonMighty Joe Young (1949) - Mr. Jones (uncredited)Satan's Cradle (1949) - Henry Lane,The PreacherThe Dalton Gang (1949) - Amos BolingChinatown at Midnight (1949) - Greer Pharmacy DruggistDancing in the Dark (1949) - Stephen (uncredited)Red Desert (1949) - Sparky JacksonSamson and Delilah (1949) - (uncredited)The Inspector General (1949) - Burbis (uncredited)Key to the City (1950) - Custodian (uncredited)The Girl from San Lorenzo (1950) - Ross, station agentRiding High (1950) - Maitre d' (uncredited)Salt Lake Raiders (1950) - John Sutton - LawyerChampagne for Caesar (1950) - GeraldUnion Station (1950) - Horace - Baggage Clerk (uncredited)The Return of Jesse James (1950) - Rufe DakinDark City (1950) - Motel Manager (uncredited)To Please a Lady (1950) - Shoe Fitter (uncredited)Experiment Alcatraz (1950) - Jim Carlton - RealtorThe Cisco Kid (1950-1954, TV Series) - Claude Bobkins Jr. / Harley, Bank presidentGasoline Alley (1951) - Charles D. HavenLightning Strikes Twice (1951) - Hummel, Hotel Clerk (uncredited)Home Town Story (1951) - Berny MilesBest of the Badmen (1951) - Judge (uncredited)Disc Jockey (1951) - Clerk (uncredited)FBI Girl (1951) - Morgue AttendantThe Sea Hornet (1951) - ClerkSuperman and the Mole Men (1951) - Jeff Reagan (uncredited)The Steel Fist (1952) - Prof. KardinRose of Cimarron (1952) - CoronerMutiny (1952) - Chairman Parson's Secretary (uncredited)My Six Convicts (1952) - Dr. Brint - DentistHold That Line (1952) - Mathematics Professor Grog (uncredited)The Sniper (1952) - Peter Eureka (uncredited)Skirts Ahoy! (1952) - Tearoom Manager (uncredited)Apache Country (1952) - Secretary Bartlett (uncredited)Cripple Creek (1952) - S. Hawkins - Undertaker (uncredited)We're Not Married! (1952) - Marriage License Bureau Clerk (uncredited)The Star (1952) - Druggist (uncredited)Ellis in Freedomland (1952) - WatchmanThe Magnetic Monster (1953) - Mr. SimonI Love Lucy (1953) S2E25 “Lucy’s Last Birthday” - Leader of the bandConfidentially Connie (1953) - Prof. Rosenberg (uncredited)A Perilous Journey (1953) - Martin, Desk Clerk (uncredited)Run for the Hills (1953) - Mr. SimpsonGun Belt (1953) - The Hotel Clerk (uncredited)Cruisin' Down the River (1953) - Ben Fisher (uncredited)Bandits of the West (1953) - Eric StriklerThe Moonlighter (1953) - Mr. Gurley (uncredited)Paris Model (1953) - Ernest BoggsThe Flaming Urge (1953) - A. Horace PenderThe Rocket Man (1954) - Card Player Wearing Glasses (uncredited)Silver Lode (1954) - Prescott (uncredited)Cattle Queen of Montana (1954) - Land Office ClerkThe Scarlet Coat (1955) - Man with Delivery for Mr. Moody (uncredited)The Spoilers (1955) - MontroseAt Gunpoint (1955) - Larry, the Teller (uncredited)Thunder Over Arizona (1956) - Byron (uncredited)You Can't Run Away from It (1956) - Billings, Andrews' SecretaryThe Desperados Are in Town (1956) - Jim DayThe Young Stranger (1957) - Mr. Doyle (uncredited)Curfew Breakers (1957) - School PrincipalThe Phantom Stagecoach (1957) - Mr. Fenshaw (uncredited)The River's Edge (1957) - Floyd BarryThe Iron Sheriff (1937) - Jed - Court Clerk (uncredited)Sierra Stranger (1957) - Claim Clerk KelsoDino (1957) - Gas Station Attendant (uncredited)The Buckskin Lady (1957) - LathamGun Battle at Monterey (1957) - CarsonUp in Smoke (1957) - Mr. BubbMan from God's Country (1958) - Will Potter (uncredited)Going Steady (1958) - Mr. George PotterThe Long, Hot Summer (1958) - Harris (uncredited)Terror in a Texas Town (1958) - The Minister (uncredited)Onionhead (1958) - Funeral Director (scenes deleted)King of the Wild Stallions (1959) - A.B. OrcuttHigh School Big Shot (1959) - Mr. MathewsThe Rebel Set (1959) - Conductor, Chicago TrainMa Barker's Killer Brood (1960) - Dr. GuelffeTwelve Hours to Kill (1960) - Selby GardnerDevil's Partner (1961) - PapersPocketful of Miracles (1961) - Lloyd (uncredited)Ride the High Country (1962) - Abner Samson (uncredited)Son of Flubber (1963) - Proprietor (uncredited)Who's Minding the Store? (1963) - Bargain Sale Department Manager (uncredited)Guns of Diablo (1964) - Bit Part (uncredited)Marriage on the Rocks (1965) - Mr. Bruno (uncredited)The Swinger (1966) - Court Clerk (uncredited)The Spirit Is Willing (1967) - Drug Store Owner (uncredited)The Gnome-Mobile (1967) - Hotel Desk Clerk (uncredited)Blackbeard's Ghost (1968) - Mr. Harrison - First Bidder (uncredited)Hook, Line & Sinker (1969) - Funeral Director (uncredited)The Love War (1970, TV Movie) - WillThe Cockeyed Cowboys of Calico County (1970) - Rev. MarshallThere Was a Crooked Man...'' (1970) - Member of Town Council (uncredited) (final film role)

References

External links

 
 
 
 

1899 births
1970 deaths
University of Utah alumni
Male actors from Utah
American male film actors
American male stage actors
American male television actors
20th-century American male actors
Burials at Inglewood Park Cemetery
Latter Day Saints from Utah